Presidente Dutra may refer to the following places in Brazil:

 Presidente Dutra, Bahia
 Presidente Dutra, Maranhão